Valeri Valeryevich Lebedev (born 17 March 1976) is a former Russian football player.

References

1976 births
Living people
Russian footballers
FC Tyumen players
Russian Premier League players
FC Irtysh Omsk players

Association football defenders